Leonard Randolph Wilkens (born October 28, 1937) is an American former basketball player and coach in the National Basketball Association (NBA). He has been inducted three times into the Naismith Memorial Basketball Hall of Fame, first in 1989 as a player, as a coach in 1998, and in 2010 as part of the 1992 United States Olympic "Dream Team," for which he was an assistant coach. In 1996, Wilkens was named to the NBA 50th Anniversary Team, and in 2021 he was named to the NBA 75th Anniversary Team. In addition, in 2022 he was also named to the list of the 15 Greatest Coaches in NBA History, being the only person to be in both NBA 75th season celebration list as player and coach. He is also a 2006 inductee into the College Basketball Hall of Fame.

Wilkens was a combined 13-time NBA All-Star as a player (nine times) and as a head coach (four times), was the 1993 NBA Coach of the Year, won the 1979 NBA championship as the head coach of the Seattle SuperSonics, and an Olympic gold medal as the head coach of the 1996 U.S. men's basketball team.

During the 1994–95 season, Wilkens set the record for most regular season coaching wins in NBA history, a record he held when he retired with 1,332 victories. , he is in third place on the list, behind Don Nelson and Gregg Popovich. Wilkens won the Chuck Daly Lifetime Achievement Award for the 2010–11 NBA season. Wilkens is also the most prolific coach in NBA history, at 2,487 regular-season games, 89 more games than Nelson, and over 400 more than any other coach, and has more losses than any other coach in NBA history, at 1,155.

Early life
Wilkens grew up in the Bedford–Stuyvesant neighborhood of Brooklyn. His father was African American and his mother was Irish American. Wilkens was raised in the Catholic faith.

At Boys High School, Wilkens was a basketball teammate of longtime Major League Baseball star Tommy Davis, and played for coach Mickey Fisher.

College career

Wilkens was a two-time All-American (1959 and 1960) at Providence College. He led the team to their first NIT appearance in 1959, and to the NIT finals in 1960. When he graduated, Wilkens was, with 1,193 points, the second-ranked scorer in Friar history (he has since dropped to 20th as of 2005). In 1996, Wilkens' No. 14 jersey was retired by the college, the first alumnus to receive such an honor. In honor of his collegiate accomplishments, Wilkens was one of the inaugural inductees into the College Basketball Hall of Fame in 2006.

Professional career

St. Louis Hawks (1960–1968)
Wilkens was drafted sixth overall by the St. Louis Hawks in the 1960 NBA draft. He began his career with eight seasons with the St. Louis Hawks, who lost the finals to the Boston Celtics in his rookie season. The Hawks made the playoffs consistently with Wilkens but never again reached the finals. Wilkens placed second to Wilt Chamberlain in the 1967–1968 MVP balloting, his last with the Hawks.

Seattle SuperSonics (1968–1972)
Wilkens was traded to the Seattle SuperSonics for Walt Hazzard and spent four seasons there. He averaged 22.4 points, 6.2 rebounds, and 8.2 assists per game in his first season for the SuperSonics, and was an All-Star in three of his seasons for them. He was named head coach in his second season with the team. Although the SuperSonics did not reach the playoffs while Wilkens simultaneously coached and started at point guard, their record improved each season and they won 47 games during the 1971–72 NBA season. Wilkens was dealt to the Cleveland Cavaliers before the start of the next season in a highly unpopular trade, and the SuperSonics fell to 26-56 without his leadership on the court.

Cleveland Cavaliers (1972–1974)
Wilkens played two seasons with the Cleveland Cavaliers.

Portland Trail Blazers (1974–1975)
Wilkens played one with the Portland Trail Blazers.

Legacy
Wilkens scored 17,772 points during the regular season, was a nine-time NBA All-Star, and was named the 1971 NBA All-Star Game MVP in 1971. With Seattle, he led the league in assists in the 1969–70 season, and at the time of his retirement was the NBA's second all-time leader in that category, behind only Oscar Robertson. In 2021, to commemorate the NBA's 75th Anniversary The Athletic ranked their top 75 players of all time, and named Wilkins as the 75th greatest player in NBA history.

Coaching career
From 1969 to 1972 with Seattle, and in his one season as a player with Portland, he was a player-coach. He retired from playing in 1975 and was the full-time coach of the Trail Blazers for one more season. After a season off from coaching, he again became coach of the SuperSonics when he replaced Bob Hopkins who was fired 22 games into the 1977–78 season after a dismal 5–17 start. The SuperSonics won 11 of their first 12 games under Wilkens and made the playoffs in back-to-back years, losing in seven games to the Washington Bullets in the 1978 NBA Finals before returning to the 1979 NBA Finals and defeating the Washington Bullets in five games for their first and only NBA title.

He coached in Seattle for eight seasons (1977–1985), winning his (and Seattle's) only NBA championship in 1979. He would go on to coach Cleveland (1986–1993), Atlanta (1993–2000), Toronto (2000–2003) and New York (2004–05).

The Hall of Famer was named head coach of the New York Knicks on January 15, 2004. After the Knicks' slow start to the 2004–05 season, Wilkens resigned from the team on January 22, 2005.

Later years
On November 29, 2006, he was hired as vice chairman of the Seattle SuperSonics' ownership group, and was later named the Sonics' President of Basketball Operations on April 27, 2007. On July 6, 2007, Wilkens resigned from the Sonics organization.

Wilkens later worked at Northwest FSN Studio as a college basketball analyst and occasionally appears on College Hoops Northwest at game nights.

Personal life 
Since 1962, Wilkens has been married to Marilyn Reed, with whom he has a son, Randy.

He is the founder of the Lenny Wilkens Foundation for Children and lives in Medina, Washington. He is a practicing Catholic.

Awards and honors
NBA
1979 NBA champion (as head coach of Seattle)
13-time NBA All-Star
nine times as a player
four times as a head coach
1971 NBA All-Star Game MVP
1994 NBA Coach of the Year
2011 Chuck Daly Lifetime Achievement Award
No. 19 retired by Seattle SuperSonics (carried over to the Oklahoma City Thunder)
Top 10 Coaches in NBA History (NBA 50th Anniversary)
Top 15 Coaches in NBA History (NBA 75th Anniversary)

USA Basketball
Two-time Olympic gold medal winner:
1992 as an assistant coach with the "Dream Team"
1996 as head coach of the U.S. men's team

Halls of Fame
Three-time Naismith Memorial Basketball Hall of Fame inductee
class of 1989 as a player 
class of 1998 as a coach 
class of 2010 as a member of the "Dream Team"
Cleveland Cavaliers Wall of Honor (class of 2022)
U.S. Olympic Hall of Fame (class of 2009 - as a member of the "Dream Team")
FIBA Hall of Fame (class of 2017 - as a member of the "Dream Team")
College Basketball Hall of Fame (class of 2006)
Providence College Hall of Fame.

State/Local
City of Seattle renamed Thomas Street to Lenny Wilkens Way.

Organizational
1999 Golden Plate Award of the American Academy of Achievement

Quotes
"I learned my basketball on the playgrounds of Brooklyn. Today, being a playground player is an insult. It means all you want to do is go one-on-one, it means your fundamentals stink and you don't understand the game. But the playgrounds I knew were tremendous training grounds."
"Show people how to have success and then you can push their expectations up."

Head coaching record

|-
| style="text-align:left;"|Seattle
| style="text-align:left;"|
|82||36||46|||| style="text-align:center;"|5th in Western|||—||—||—||—
| style="text-align:center;"|Missed playoffs
|-
| style="text-align:left;"|Seattle
| style="text-align:left;"|
|82||38||44|||| style="text-align:center;"|4th in Pacific|||—||—||—||—
| style="text-align:center;"|Missed playoffs
|-
| style="text-align:left;"|Seattle
| style="text-align:left;"|
|82||47||35|||| style="text-align:center;"|3rd in Pacific|||—||—||—||—
| style="text-align:center;"|Missed playoffs
|-
| style="text-align:left;"|Portland
| style="text-align:left;"|
|82||38||44|||| style="text-align:center;"|3rd in Pacific|||—||—||—||—
| style="text-align:center;"|Missed playoffs
|-
| style="text-align:left;"|Portland
| style="text-align:left;"|
|82||37||45|||| style="text-align:center;"|5th in Pacific|||—||—||—||—
| style="text-align:center;"|Missed playoffs
|-
| style="text-align:left;"|Seattle
| style="text-align:left;"|
|60||42||18|||| style="text-align:center;"|3rd in Pacific|||22||13||9||
| style="text-align:center;"|Lost in NBA Finals
|- ! style="background:#FDE910;"
| style="text-align:left;"|Seattle
| style="text-align:left;"|
|82||52||30|||| style="text-align:center;"|1st in Pacific|||17||12||5||
| style="text-align:center;"|Won NBA Championship
|-
| style="text-align:left;"|Seattle
| style="text-align:left;"|
|82||56||26|||| style="text-align:center;"|2nd in Pacific|||15||7||8||
| style="text-align:center;"|Lost in Conf. Finals
|-
| style="text-align:left;"|Seattle
| style="text-align:left;"|
|82||34||48|||| style="text-align:center;"|6th in Pacific|||—||—||—||—
| style="text-align:center;"|Missed playoffs
|-
| style="text-align:left;"|Seattle
| style="text-align:left;"|
|82||52||30|||| style="text-align:center;"|2nd in Pacific|||8||3||5||
| style="text-align:center;"|Lost in Conf. Semifinals
|-
| style="text-align:left;"|Seattle
| style="text-align:left;"|
|82||48||34|||| style="text-align:center;"|3rd in Pacific|||2||0||2||
| style="text-align:center;"|Lost in First Round
|-
| style="text-align:left;"|Seattle
| style="text-align:left;"|
|82||42||40|||| style="text-align:center;"|3rd in Pacific|||5||2||3||
| style="text-align:center;"|Lost in First Round
|-
| style="text-align:left;"|Seattle
| style="text-align:left;"|
|82||31||51|||| style="text-align:center;"|5th in Pacific|||—||—||—||—
| style="text-align:center;"|Missed playoffs
|-
| style="text-align:left;"|Cleveland
| style="text-align:left;"|
|82||31||51|||| style="text-align:center;"|4th in Central|||—||—||—||—
| style="text-align:center;"|Missed playoffs
|-
| style="text-align:left;"|Cleveland
| style="text-align:left;"|
|82||42||40|||| style="text-align:center;"|4th in Central|||5||2||3||
| style="text-align:center;"|Lost in First Round
|-
| style="text-align:left;"|Cleveland
| style="text-align:left;"|
|82||57||25|||| style="text-align:center;"|2nd in Central|||5||2||3||
| style="text-align:center;"|Lost in First Round
|-
| style="text-align:left;"|Cleveland
| style="text-align:left;"|
|82||42||40|||| style="text-align:center;"|4th in Central|||5||2||3||
| style="text-align:center;"|Lost in First Round
|-
| style="text-align:left;"|Cleveland
| style="text-align:left;"|
|82||33||49|||| style="text-align:center;"|6th in Central|||—||—||—||—
| style="text-align:center;"|Missed playoffs
|-
| style="text-align:left;"|Cleveland
| style="text-align:left;"|
|82||57||25|||| style="text-align:center;"|2nd in Central|||17||9||8||
| style="text-align:center;"|Lost in Conf. Finals
|-
| style="text-align:left;"|Cleveland
| style="text-align:left;"|
|82||54||28|||| style="text-align:center;"|2nd in Central|||9||3||6||
| style="text-align:center;"|Lost in Conf. Semifinals
|-
| style="text-align:left;"|Atlanta
| style="text-align:left;"|
|82||57||25|||| style="text-align:center;"|1st in Central|||11||5||6||
| style="text-align:center;"|Lost in Conf. Semifinals
|-
| style="text-align:left;"|Atlanta
| style="text-align:left;"|
|82||42||40|||| style="text-align:center;"|5th in Central|||3||0||3||
| style="text-align:center;"|Lost in First Round
|-
| style="text-align:left;"|Atlanta
| style="text-align:left;"|
|82||46||36|||| style="text-align:center;"|4th in Central|||10||4||6||
| style="text-align:center;"|Lost in Conf. Semifinals
|-
| style="text-align:left;"|Atlanta
| style="text-align:left;"|
|82||56||26|||| style="text-align:center;"|2nd in Central|||10||4||6||
| style="text-align:center;"|Lost in Conf. Semifinals
|-
| style="text-align:left;"|Atlanta
| style="text-align:left;"|
|82||50||32|||| style="text-align:center;"|4th in Central|||4||1||3||
| style="text-align:center;"|Lost in First Round
|-
| style="text-align:left;"|Atlanta
| style="text-align:left;"|
|50||31||19|||| style="text-align:center;"|2nd in Central|||9||3||6||
| style="text-align:center;"|Lost in Conf. Semifinals
|-
| style="text-align:left;"|Atlanta
| style="text-align:left;"|
|82||28||54|||| style="text-align:center;"|7th in Central|||—||—||—||—
| style="text-align:center;"|Missed playoffs
|-
| style="text-align:left;"|Toronto
| style="text-align:left;"|
|82||47||35|||| style="text-align:center;"|2nd in Central|||12||6||6||
| style="text-align:center;"|Lost in Conf. Semifinals
|-
| style="text-align:left;"|Toronto
| style="text-align:left;"|
|82||42||40|||| style="text-align:center;"|3rd in Central|||5||2||3||
| style="text-align:center;"|Lost in First Round
|-
| style="text-align:left;"|Toronto
| style="text-align:left;"|
|82||24||58|||| style="text-align:center;"|7th in Central|||—||—||—||—
| style="text-align:center;"|Missed playoffs
|-
| style="text-align:left;"|New York
| style="text-align:left;"|
|42||23||19|||| style="text-align:center;"|3rd in Atlantic|||4||0||4||
| style="text-align:center;"|Lost in First Round
|-
| style="text-align:left;"|New York
| style="text-align:left;"|
|39||17||22|||| style="text-align:center;"|(resigned)|||—||—||—||—
| style="text-align:center;"|—
|- class="sortbottom"
| style="text-align:left;"|Career
| ||2,487||1,332||1,155|||| ||178||80||98||||

NBA career statistics

Regular season 

|-
| style="text-align:left;"|
| style="text-align:left;"|St. Louis
| 74 || – || 25.3 || .425 || – || .713 || 4.5 || 2.8 || – || – || 11.7
|-
| style="text-align:left;"| 
| style="text-align:left;"|St. Louis
| 20 || – || 43.5 || .385 || – || .764 || 6.6 || 5.8 || – || – || 18.2
|-
| style="text-align:left;"| 
| style="text-align:left;"|St. Louis
| 75 || – || 34.3 || .399 || – || .696 || 5.4 || 5.1 || – || – || 11.8
|-
| style="text-align:left;"| 
| style="text-align:left;"|St. Louis
| 78 || – || 32.4 || .413 || – || .740 || 4.3 || 4.6 || – || – || 12.0
|-
| style="text-align:left;"| 
| style="text-align:left;"|St. Louis
| 78 || – || 36.6 || .414 || – || .746 || 4.7 || 5.5 || – || – || 16.5
|-
| style="text-align:left;"| 
| style="text-align:left;"|St. Louis
| 69 || – || 39.0 || .431 || – || .793 || 4.7 || 6.2 || – || – || 18.0
|-
| style="text-align:left;"| 
| style="text-align:left;"|St. Louis
| 78 || – || 38.1 || .432 || – || .787 || 5.3 || 5.7 || – || – || 17.4
|-
| style="text-align:left;"| 
| style="text-align:left;"|St. Louis
| 82 || – || 38.6 || .438 || – || .768 || 5.3 || 8.3 || – || – || 20.0
|-
| style="text-align:left;"| 
| style="text-align:left;"|Seattle
| 82 || – || 42.2 || .440 || – || .770 || 6.2 || 8.2 || – || – || 22.4
|-
| style="text-align:left;"| 
| style="text-align:left;"|Seattle
| 75 || – || 37.4 || .420 || – || .788 || 5.0 ||style="background:#cfecec;"| 9.1* || – || – || 17.8
|-
| style="text-align:left;"| 
| style="text-align:left;"|Seattle
| 71 || – || 37.2 || .419 || – || .803 || 4.5 || 9.2 || – || – || 19.8
|-
| style="text-align:left;"| 
| style="text-align:left;"|Seattle
| 80 || – || 37.4 || .466 || – || .774 || 4.2 || 9.6 || – || – || 18.0
|-
| style="text-align:left;"| 
| style="text-align:left;"|Cleveland
| 75 || – || 39.6 || .449 || – || .828 || 4.6 || 8.4 || – || – || 20.5
|-
| style="text-align:left;"| 
| style="text-align:left;"|Cleveland
| 74 || – || 33.6 || .465 || – || .801 || 3.7 || 7.1 || 1.3 || 0.2 || 16.4
|-
| style="text-align:left;"| 
| style="text-align:left;"|Portland
| 65 || – || 17.9 || .439 || – || .768 || 1.8 || 3.6 || 1.2 || 0.1 || 6.5
|- class="sortbottom"
| style="text-align:center;" colspan="2"| Career
| 1,077 || – || 35.3 || .432 || – || .774 || 4.7 || 6.7 || 1.3 || 0.2 || 16.5
|- class="sortbottom"
| style="text-align:center;" colspan="2"| All-Star
| 9 || 3 || 20.2 || .400 || – || .781 || 2.4 || 2.9 || – || – || 9.4

Playoffs 

|-
|style="text-align:left;"|1961
|style="text-align:left;"|St. Louis
|12||–||36.4||.380||–||.759||6.0||3.5||–||–||14.2
|-
|style="text-align:left;"|1963
|style="text-align:left;"|St. Louis
|11||–||36.4||.370||–||.755||6.3||6.3||–||–||13.7
|-
|style="text-align:left;"|1964
|style="text-align:left;"|St. Louis
|12||–||34.4||.448||–||.759||5.0||5.3||–||–||14.3
|-
|style="text-align:left;"|1965
|style="text-align:left;"|St. Louis
|4||–||36.8||.351||–||.828||3.0||3.8||–||–||16.0
|-
|style="text-align:left;"|1966
|style="text-align:left;"|St. Louis
|10||–||39.1||.399||–||.687||5.4||7.0||–||–||17.1
|-
|style="text-align:left;"|1967
|style="text-align:left;"|St. Louis
|9||–||42.0||.400||–||.856||7.6||7.2||–||–||21.4
|-
|style="text-align:left;"|1968
|style="text-align:left;"|St. Louis
|6||–||39.5||.440||–||.750||6.3||7.8||–||–||16.1
|- class="sortbottom"
| style="text-align:center;" colspan="2"| Career
| 64 || – || 37.5 || .399 || – || .769 || 5.8 || 5.8 || – || – || 16.1

See also

 List of National Basketball Association career free throw scoring leaders
 List of National Basketball Association career assists leaders
 List of National Basketball Association career minutes played leaders
 List of National Basketball Association players with most assists in a game

References

External links
 
 
 Basketball-Reference.com: Lenny Wilkens (as a player)
 Basketball-Reference.com: Lenny Wilkens (as a coach) 
 Stories of Atlanta - Odd Man Out

1937 births
Living people
African-American basketball coaches
African-American basketball players
All-American college men's basketball players
American expatriate basketball people in Canada
American Olympic coaches
American people of Irish descent
Atlanta Hawks head coaches
Basketball coaches from New York (state)
Boys High School (Brooklyn) alumni
Cleveland Cavaliers head coaches
Cleveland Cavaliers players
Naismith Memorial Basketball Hall of Fame inductees
National Basketball Association All-Stars
National Basketball Association broadcasters
National Basketball Association championship-winning head coaches
National Basketball Association executives
National Basketball Association players with retired numbers
New York Knicks head coaches
People from Bedford–Stuyvesant, Brooklyn
Player-coaches
Point guards
Portland Trail Blazers head coaches
Portland Trail Blazers players
Providence Friars men's basketball players
Seattle SuperSonics general managers
Seattle SuperSonics head coaches
Seattle SuperSonics players
Sportspeople from Brooklyn
Basketball players from New York City
St. Louis Hawks draft picks
St. Louis Hawks players
Toronto Raptors head coaches
United States men's national basketball team coaches
People from Medina, Washington
American men's basketball players
African-American Catholics
21st-century African-American people
20th-century African-American sportspeople